Student Leader, founded in 1992 by W.H. "Butch" Oxendine, Jr., is a national college magazine that focuses on campus leaders, student governments, clubs, and organizations at American colleges and universities. In 2004, Student Leader became the official magazine of the American Student Government Association. The magazine was published quarterly until 2007 when it ceased print version. Student Leader is widely read at more than 1,000 colleges and universities across the nation.

Student Leader is based in Gainesville, Florida.

References

External links
 Student Leader Magazine Online

1992 establishments in Florida
2007 disestablishments in Florida
Online magazines published in the United States
Quarterly magazines published in the United States
Student magazines published in the United States
Defunct magazines published in the United States
Magazines established in 1992
Magazines disestablished in 2007
Magazines published in Florida
Online magazines with defunct print editions